Street Music is the third album by Defari, an American hip hop musician who is also part of the Likwit Crew. The album features regular collaborators Evidence, J-Ro, E-Swift, The Alchemist and DJ Babu, the latter Defari's partner in the Likwit Junkies.

Track listing

"Hardworker" - 3:14
"Either Dead or in Jail" (featuring Tuffy and Boo Kapone) - 4:17
"Congratulations" - 4:16
"Peace and Gangsta" - 2:41
"Make My Own" (featuring Evidence) - 3:53
"West West" - 3:38
"We've Been Doin' This" (featuring Threat and J-Ro) - 3:44
"Burn Big" - 3:36
"Barwork" (featuring Krondon) - 3:37
"Deepest Regards" (featuring B-Real and J-Ro) - 3:58
"People Trip" - 3:53
"Clowns" (featuring Dilated Peoples) - 4:16
"The Bizness" - 3:16
"Don't Be Mad at Me" - 3:37
"Vultures" - 4:37

Personnel
 Engineering: Eric L. Brooks, Gene Grimaldi
 Mastering: Gene Grimaldi
 Design: Justin Herman
 Layout Design: Justin Herman
 Cover Photo: Justin Herman

References

2006 albums
Defari albums
Albums produced by Evidence (musician)
Albums produced by the Alchemist (musician)